Switzerland participated in the Eurovision Song Contest 2002 with the song "Dans le jardin de mon âme" written and performed by Francine Jordi. The Swiss broadcaster SRG SSR idée suisse returned to the Eurovision Song Contest after a one-year absence following their relegation from 2001 as one of the bottom six countries in the 2000 contest. The Swiss entry for the 2002 contest in Tallinn, Estonia was selected through the national final Eurosong 2002, organised by SRG SSR idée suisse. Eight entries performed during the national final on 2 February 2002 where two rounds of public voting ultimately selected "Dans le jardin" performed by Francine Jordi as the winner. The song was later retitled as "Dans le jardin de mon âme".

Switzerland competed in the Eurovision Song Contest which took place on 25 May 2002. Performing during the show in position 11, Switzerland placed twenty-second out of the 24 participating countries, scoring 22 points.

Background 

Prior to the 2002 Contest, Switzerland had participated in the Eurovision Song Contest forty-three times since its first entry in 1956. Switzerland is noted for having won the first edition of the Eurovision Song Contest with the song "Refrain" performed by Lys Assia. Their second and, to this point, most recent victory was achieved in 1988 when Canadian singer Céline Dion won the contest with the song "Ne partez pas sans moi". In 2000, Switzerland placed 20th earning 14 points with the song "La vita cos'è?" performed by Jane Bogaert.

The Swiss national broadcaster, SRG SSR idée suisse, broadcasts the event within Switzerland and organises the selection process for the nation's entry. Switzerland has selected their entry for the Eurovision Song Contest through both national finals and internal selections in the past. Since 1998, the broadcaster has opted to organize a national final in order to select the Swiss entry, a selection procedure that continued for their 2002 entry.

Before Eurovision

Eurosong 2002 
Eurosong 2002 was the Swiss national final that selected Switzerland's entry for the Eurovision Song Contest 2002. The national final took place on 2 February 2002 at the Garage Music venue in Arbedo-Castione/Bellinzona, hosted by Milena Martelli and was televised on SF DRS with German commentary by Sandra Studer, TSI and TSR with French commentary by Jean-Marc Richard and Phil Mundwiller.

Competing entries 
SRG SSR idée suisse opened a submission period for interested artists and composers to submit their entries until 19 October 2001. Eligible artists were those that have a Swiss passport or are a resident in Switzerland. 154 entries were submitted following the submission deadline; 58 of the entry submissions were by artists from German-speaking Switzerland, while 60 were from French-speaking Switzerland and 36 were from Italian-speaking Switzerland. The nine artists and songs that qualified for the national final were announced on 13 November 2001. Prior to the competition, Camen withdrew her song "First Love", written by Pascal Camenzind and Martin Gisler, due to health issues.

Final 

The final took place on 2 February 2002. The eight candidate songs in contention to represent Switzerland were performed and two rounds of televoting selected the winner. In the first round, the top three entries were selected to advance to the second round. In the second round, "Dans le jardin" performed by Francine Jordi was selected as the winner. In addition to the performances from the competing entries, the interval act featured a newly recorded performance of "O mein Papa" by Swiss 1956 Eurovision winner as well as 1957 and 1958 entrant Lys Assia.

At Eurovision
According to Eurovision rules, all nations with the exceptions of the bottom six countries in the 2001 contest competed in the final. On 9 November 2001, a special allocation draw was held which determined the running order and Switzerland was set to perform in position 11, following the entry from Israel and before the entry from Sweden. Switzerland finished in twenty-second place with 15 points.

In Switzerland, three broadcasters that form SRG SSR idée suisse aired both shows of the contest. 1991 Swiss Eurovision Song Contest entrant Sandra Studer provided German commentary on SF DRS, Phil Mundwiller provided French commentary on TSR, while Jonathan Tedesco and Claudio Lazzarino provided Italian commentary on TSI. The Swiss spokesperson, who announced the Swiss votes during the final, was Diana Jörg.

Voting 
Below is a breakdown of points awarded to Switzerland and awarded by Switzerland in the contest. The nation awarded its 12 points to Spain in the contest.

References

External links
Swiss National Final 2002

2002
Countries in the Eurovision Song Contest 2002
Eurovision